Marc Mellits (born 1966) is an American composer and musician.

Mellits was born in Baltimore, Maryland. He studied at the Eastman School of Music from 1984 to 1988, at the Yale School of Music from 1989 to 1991, at Cornell University from 1991 to 1996, and at Tanglewood in the summer of 1997. His composition instructors include Joseph Schwantner, Samuel Adler, Martin Bresnick, Bernard Rands, Christopher Rouse, Roberto Sierra, Jacob Druckman, Poul Ruders, and Steven Stucky.

Mellits's music has been performed throughout the United States, Canada, and Europe. His music is influenced by minimalist and rock music, and has been identified with the postminimalist stylistic trend. He often composes for electric guitar and other amplified instruments.

Mellits received a 2004 Foundation for Contemporary Arts Grants to Artists Award. Mellits's commissions include pieces for the Orpheus Chamber Orchestra, Bang on a Can All-Stars, Assad Duo, Kronos Quartet, and the Meridian Arts Ensemble. His music has also been arranged by guitarist Dominic Frasca and the experimental music group Electric Kompany.

Mellits is a founding member of Common Sense Composers' Collective, which focuses on new and alternative ways of collaborating with performance ensembles. Mellits is the artistic director and keyboard player in his ensemble, the Mellits Consort.

As of 2011, Marc Mellits lives in Chicago, Illinois with his wife and two daughters, and teaches composition at the University of Illinois-Chicago.

Discography
 1997 Common Sense Composers' Collective: Polysorbate 60
 2002 Shock of the Old, Common Sense Composers' Collective & American Baroque: 11 Miiniatures for Baroque Ensemble
 2005 Deviations, Dominic Frasca: Dometude, Lefty's Elegy, Metaclopramide, Dark Age Machinery
 2006 String Quartet No. 2, Duke Quartet: String Quartet No. 2
 2006 Tight Sweater, Real Quiet plays the music of Marc Mellits: Tight Sweater, Agu, Fruity Pebbles, Disciples of Gouda
 2007 Dirty Little Secret, Andrew Russo: Etude No. 1: Medieval Induction
 2007 TIC, Common Sense Composers' Collective & New Millennium Ensemble: Spam
 2007 Paranoid Cheese, The Mellits Consort: Opening, Broken Glass, paranoid cheese, The Misadventures of Soup, Lefty's Elegy, Machine IV, Srećan Rođendan, Marija!, Troica, Dreadlocked, Machine III, Machine V
 2008 Melville's Dozen, Nicola Melville: Etude No. 2: Defensive Chili
 2008 Mix Tape, Andrew Russo: Spank Me (Menage a Deux), Curried Kaftka (No Strings Attached)
 2009 Serendipity, Society for New Music: Platter of Discontent
 2009 American Journey, Roger McVey: Agu
 2010 Convergence, Strike: Tight Sweater Remix
 2010 Black, Sqwonk: Black
 2017 Quatuor Debussy: Marc Mellits, String Quartets n° 3, 4, 5.

References

 Dickenson, J. Andrew: "Electric Counterpoint", Urban Guitar, July 2006

External links 
 Marc Mellits' homepage
Marc Mellits Audio Portrait ASCAP

Cornell University alumni
Living people
1966 births
Musicians from Baltimore
American male classical composers
American classical composers
20th-century classical composers
Pupils of Jacob Druckman
Pupils of Samuel Adler (composer)
Pupils of Joseph Schwantner
20th-century American composers
20th-century American male musicians